This is a list of Japanese football J3 League transfers in the winter transfer window 2015–16 by club.

Source:

Oita Trinita 

In:

Out:

Tochigi SC 

In:

Out:

Nagano Parceiro 

In:

Out:

SC Sagamihara 

In:

Out:

Kataller Toyama 

In:

Out:

Gainare Tottori 

In:

Out:

Fukushima United 

In:

Out:

Blaublitz Akita 

In:

Out:

FC Ryukyu 

In:

Out:

Fujieda MYFC 

In:

Out:

Grulla Morioka 

In:

Out:

YSCC 

In:

Out:

Kagoshima United FC 

In:

Out:

References 

2015-16
Transfers
Japan